Niobium bromide may refer to
 Niobium(III) bromide. NbBr3
 Niobium(IV) bromide, NbBr4
 Niobium(V) bromide, NbBr5

References

Niobium compounds
Bromides
Metal halides